Canal warehouse may refer to:

Canal warehouse, a commercial building along a canal
Canal Warehouse (Chillicothe, Ohio), a former warehouse in Chillicothe, Ohio, U.S.

See also
Black River Canal Warehouse
Rail and Titsworth Canal Warehouse